The Samsonite House is a historic house located in the neighborhood of Lincoln Park in Denver, Colorado. The home on Galapago Street is representative of the Italianate style of architecture, with a flat-roof cornice and tall narrow windows. It first was a rectory for the  St. Joseph's Roman Catholic Church and was then owned by the Shwayder family, founders of Samsonite Corporation.

The Samsonite House received historic designation as a Denver Landmark by the Denver City Council on February 12, 2019.

History
The two-story house was built in 1890 by the builder James J. Castillo, and originally served as a rectory for  St. Joseph's Roman Catholic Church across the street.

The house was bought and sold several times by January 18, 1900, when it was purchased by Solomon Shwayder, son of Isaac and Raechel Shwayder, from Edward T. Jones. Solomon sold the property to his mother Rachael Leah (Kobey) Shwayder 17 months later on July 1, 1901. Rachael Shwayder raised her family in the home and sold it in 1921.

Notes

References

Buildings and structures in Denver
Houses completed in 1890
Samsonite
Denver landmarks